There are four species of bird named green woodpecker:
 European green woodpecker, Picus viridis
 Iberian green woodpecker, Picus sharpei
 Japanese green woodpecker, Picus awokera
 Cuban green woodpecker, 	 Xiphidiopicus percussus

Birds by common name